The 2023 Memphis mayoral election will take place in 2023. Incumbent Jim Strickland is term-limited and cannot seek re-election to a third term in office.

Background

Ordinance 5823
Memphis law states that mayors can only serve two terms. However, the Memphis City Council voted to put an ordinance on the ballot that, if passed, would extend the limit to three terms. Incumbent mayor Jim Strickland expressed interest in running for a third term if Memphis voters approved the ordinance. The ordinance was decided on August 4, 2022, the same day as Tennessee's regularly-scheduled primary elections. Voters overwhelmingly rejected it, keeping the two-term limit in place and barring Strickland from seeking re-election.

Candidates

Declared
Floyd Bonner, Shelby County Sheriff (Party affiliation: Democratic)
Joe Brown, former host of Judge Joe Brown, former Shelby County Criminal Court judge, and Democratic nominee for Shelby County District Attorney in 2014 (Party affiliation: Independent)
Karen Camper, Minority Leader of the Tennessee House of Representatives (Party affiliation: Democratic)
Frank Colvett, Memphis City Councilor (Party affiliation: Republican)
J.W. Gibson, former Shelby County commissioner
Willie Herenton, former mayor (Party affiliation: Democratic)
Michelle McKissack, chair of the Shelby County Board of Education (Party affiliation: Democratic)
Van Turner, former chair of the Shelby County Commission (Party affiliation: Democratic)
Paul Young, president and CEO of the Downtown Memphis Commission and former director of the Memphis Division of Housing and Community Development

Publicly expressed interest
Keith Norman, reverend and former chair of the Shelby County Democratic Party (Party affiliation: Democratic)

Potential
Beverly Robertson, president and CEO of Greater Memphis Chamber
Patrice Robinson, Memphis City Councilor and former chair of the Memphis City Council

References

External links 
Official campaign websites
 Floyd Bonner (D) for Mayor
 Michelle McKissack (D) for Mayor
 Van Turner (D) for Mayor
 Paul Young for Mayor

Memphis
Mayoral elections in Memphis, Tennessee